Gary Dale Puckett (born October 17, 1942) is an American singer. He is best remembered for being the lead vocalist for Gary Puckett & The Union Gap, who had six consecutive gold records in 1968, including “Lady Willpower”, “Young Girl”, “Woman Woman”, and “Over You”. 

After the Union Gap disbanded in 1971, Puckett signed to Columbia and embarked on a solo career, and, after a decade-long hiatus in 1972, returned to music in the early 1980s, and has since released a handful of studio albums since the 1970s.

Early Life and Education 

Puckett was born in Hibbing, Minnesota, and grew up in Yakima, Washington, an area not far from Union Gap, Washington. Puckett learned how to sing and play guitar during his teens.

He went to college for two years in San Diego, California, majoring in psychology, then dropped out to work in a band called the Outcasts.

The Outcasts 
Gary’s first group was The Outcasts, which included Bobby Brown (bass), Dwight Bement (saxophone; Also later member of the Union Gap), Bob Salisbury (saxophone), and Willie Kellogg (drums). Originally formed as a Righteous Brothers styled duo by Puckett and Brown, their manager, Yale Kahn, owner of the Clairemont Bowl, added Bement, Salisbury, and Kellogg into the lineup.

They released two singles (one each in 1965 and ‘66), “Run Away / Would You Care”, and “I Can’t Get Through To You / I Found About You”. The Outcasts split up in 1967.

Gary Puckett & The Union Gap

Formation 
In January 1967, Puckett and Dwight Bement formed a new group after the split of The Outcasts, they called Gary and the Remarkables, consisting of Kerry Chater (August 7, 1945 – February 4, 2022; Bass), Gary 'Mutha' Withem (born August 22, 1944; Keyboard), and Paul Wheatbread (born February 8, 1946; Drums). 
The break came for the group when Jerry Fuller, a former country music artist and a producer for Columbia Records in Los Angeles, heard them at a small bar where they were performing in a bowling alley complex. Fuller liked their sound and signed them to a contract.

Initial Success 
They were now going under the name Gary Puckett & The Union Gap and would be known for hits such as "Lady Willpower", "Young Girl" and "Woman, Woman". They sold more records in 1968 than any other group and had six consecutive gold records as well as making two appearances on The Ed Sullivan Show (1968, 1971). Their song "Woman, Woman" was an adaptation of the country hit by the Glaser Brothers called "Girl, Girl". On records, they wore Civil War outfits, as suggested by Puckett, and called themselves the Union Gap after the Union Gap area where Puckett had lived. 

In 1968, the band were invited by the President of the United States (Lyndon B. Johnson) to play at the White House for Prince Charles and Princess Anne. The Union Gap are one of few artists whose first five releases went gold.

The band were nominated for a Grammy Award for Best New Artist in 1969, losing out to José Feliciano.

Split and Reformation 
The group eventually grew unhappy with doing material written and produced by others, leading them to stop working with Fuller, and they disbanded in 1971.  

Gary re-formed the band sometime in the early 1980s and, since signing to them in 1984, has performed with them at the yearly "Happy Together" tours, alongside Howard Kaylan and Mark Volman of The Turtles (who started up the tour), The Association, The Cowsills, Ron Dante of The Archies, Chuck Negron of Three Dog Night, The Buckinghams, The Box Tops, The Vogues, and The Classics IV. 

Their current line-up consists of Puckett, Woody Lingle (bass), Jamie Hilboldt (keyboards), and Mike Candito (drums) as of around 2012.

The Union Gap's "Greatest Hits" album was one of CBS' best selling "Collector Series" albums. 

In 1974 "Young Girl" was reissued by popular request in England where it reached number five and achieved a Silver Record Award for the second time.

Solo Career 
After the Union Gap split, Puckett released a solo album titled The Gary Puckett Album that same year. 

Gary released a few singles from 1970 to 1972, with his first two being a cover of Dusty Springfield’s 1964 song  I Just Don't Know What to Do with Myself and a cover of Simon & Garfunkel’s 1970 Bridge Over Troubled Water single Keep The Customer Satisfied (a song Puckett would later perform as a solo artist on the Ed Sullivan Show in January 1971).

After the release of his 1971 album, Puckett’s contract was terminated. 

Afterwards, Gary lived a private life throughout the rest of the 70s, studying acting and dance and working in theatrical productions in and around Los Angeles before he made a comeback into working in the music industry as a solo artist in the 1980s.

Puckett was on the bill for the first Monkees reunion tour in 1986, along with the Grass Roots and the then line-up of Herman's Hermits.

After a decade out of the public eye, Puckett started making Solo releases again, starting with the 1982 album “Melodie”. He has since released more albums, including, “Love Me Tonight” (1992), “As It Stands” (1995), “Time Pieces” (1996), “Is This Love” (1997), as well as a Christmas album in 2001. Puckett’s latest album is “This Is Love” (2006).

He was interviewed by Studio 10 in 2019. 

Puckett opened a Cameo account in 2021.

Personal life 
Gary Puckett married his first wife, Shirley Puckett, in 1979; they are now divorced. He married Lorrie Haimes on May 18, 2000. Lorrie has two daughters from a previous marriage, who Gary looks on and treats as his own. He currently lives in Clearwater, Florida.

Discography

The Outcasts

Singles 
 “Run Away” / “Would You Care” — 1965

 “I Can’t Get Through To You” / “I Found Out About You” — 1966

The Union Gap

Singles 

Re-releases

† – Billed as The Union Gap featuring Gary Puckett

‡ – Billed as Gary Puckett & The Union Gap

Solo 
Singles
 "I Just Don't Know What to Do with Myself" (US Billboard #61, US AC #14) / "All That Matters" – Columbia 45249 – October 1970
 "Keep the Customer Satisfied" (US Billboard #71, US AC #28) / "No One Really Knows" – Columbia 45303 – February 1971
 "Life Has Its Little Ups and Downs" (US AC #24) / "Shimmering Eyes" – Columbia 45358 – 1971
 "Gentle Woman" (US Record World #109) / "Hello Morning" – Columbia 45438 – 1971
 "I Can't Hold On" / "Hello Morning" – Columbia 45509 – 1971
 "Leavin' In The Morning" (US Record World #140) / "Bless This Child" – Columbia 45678 – 1972

Albums 
 The Gary Puckett Album (1971)
 Melodie (1982)
 Love Me Tonight (1992)
 As It Stands (1995)
 Time Pieces (1996)
 Is This Love (1997)
 Europa (1998)
 At Christmas (2001)
 The Lost Tapes (2005)
 This Is Love (2006)

See also 
 List of artists who reached number one on the UK Singles Chart
 List of acts who appeared on American Bandstand
 List of Columbia Records artists

References

External links 
 Official website
 Puckett at Discogs

1942 births
People from Minnesota
Singers from Minnesota
20th-century American male singers
20th-century American singers
21st-century American male singers
21st-century American singers
Living people